The Prophecy (Stigmata of the Immaculate) is the fourth studio album by the Canadian death metal band Kataklysm.

Track listing

Personnel
Kataklysm
 Maurizio Iacono – Vocals
 Jean-François Dagenais – Guitar, record producer
 Stéphane Barbe – Bass
 Max Duhamel – Drums

Guest musicians
 Mike DiSalvo – Guest vocals on "Laments of Fear and Despair"
 Rob "The Witch" Tremblay – Guest vocals "Manifestation"

Production
 Jean-François Dagenais – Producer, Mixing, Engineering
 Sylvain Brisebois – Mastering
 Francis Beaulieu – Engineering Assistant
 Maurizio Iacono – Lyrics

References

External links
 Kataklysm - official website
 Nuclear Blast - official website
  Kataklysm Myspace page

2000 albums
Kataklysm albums
Nuclear Blast albums